Alicia Beatriz Gutiérrez (born 1957) is an Argentine sociologist and author.

Career 
She is an investigator with the National Scientific and Technical Research Council. Gutiérrez completed a doctorate in sociology at School for Advanced Studies in the Social Sciences. She was a close colleague of Pierre Bourdieu.

Personal life and education 
Gutiérrez was born in 1957 to first generation immigrants from Spain and Italy. Her mother was an odontologist and her father was a physician. She attended . She has four children.

Selected works

Books

References

External links 
 

1957 births
Living people
Argentine sociologists
Argentine women sociologists
Academic staff of the National University of Córdoba
20th-century Argentine women writers
20th-century Argentine writers
21st-century Argentine women writers
21st-century Argentine writers
Argentine people of Spanish descent
Argentine people of Italian descent
People from Córdoba, Argentina
Academic staff of the University of Buenos Aires